Podkoren 3 is a black World Cup technical ski course on Vitranc mountain in Podkoren, Kranjska Gora, Slovenia, opened in 1983. It was constructed by Peter Lakota, a successful Slovenian skier.

It has been hosting slalom and giant slalom for Vitranc Cup (Pokal Vitranc) since then. It replaced previous slopes; Bukovniški smuk (1961–70) and old gas station slope (1971–83).

With 59% incline at start of giant slalom, it is the ski slope with the steepest part in Slovenia. It is located close to Planica and Rateče (near the Italian and Austrian borders).

This slope is considered one of top three hardest giant slaloms in the world, together with Alta Badia (ITA) and Adelboden (SUI).

The slope is part of "Podkoren I" section, one of four, right in the middle of Kranjska Gora Ski Resort.

History 
On December 1983, this course was officially opened with women's and men's slalom (20,000 people), replacing the old previous course above the nearby gas station.

In 1985, total of 40,000 people has gathered in two days. 30,000 alone at slalom where Rok Petrovič won in front home crowd, one of the most iconic and most visited and events in Kranjska Gora.

In 1986, total of 20,000 people have seen another home win for the second year in a row, with Bojan Križaj and Rok Petrovič being first and second in SL. They were at the peak of their fame and absolute national heroes, icons, with alpine skiing, especially slalom as the far most popular sport in the country in the eighties. Swiss Joël Gaspoz won the giant slalom a day before for the third year in Kranjska Gora a row.

World Cup

Men 
Vitranc Cup on this slope is held since 2 December 1983. This course hosted total of 75 World Cup events for men (6th of all-time).

Women 
On 1 December 1983, official opening with first ever event on this course held and the only "Vitranc Cup" event in women's history.

Club5+ 
In 1986, elite Club5 was originally founded by prestigious classic downhill organizers: Kitzbühel, Wengen, Garmisch, Val d’Isère and Val Gardena/Gröden, with goal to bring alpine ski sport on the highest levels possible.

Later over the years other classic longterm organizers joined the now named Club5+: Alta Badia, Cortina, Kranjska Gora, Maribor, Lake Louise, Schladming, Adelboden, Kvitfjell, St.Moritz and Åre.

References

External links 
 Vitranc Cup (official)

Alpine skiing in Slovenia
Skiing in Slovenia